Christian Andersen (born 27 November 1987) better known as  Klumben is a Copenhagen-based Danish dancehall / hip hop / reggae act. 
Christian grew up in a little town called Vemmelev. 

Already very popular with his 2010 hit "Kriminel", "Hobby" with accompanying music video and his collaborations with TopGunn in X Factor and with Raske Penge in "Rundt" and "Faxe Kondi" and his recordings with Kontrafon such as his single "Du en lort" with TopGunn, he is considered as an emerging star of dancehall in Denmark. 

He released his debut album Fra Klumben til pladen on Cheff Records / ArtPeople in May 2012 that reached #11 in the Danish Albums Chart.

Discography

Albums

Singles

Collaborations

Featured in

Videography
2012: "Hobby"

References

External links

Last.fm
HIP-HOP.DK

Danish rappers
Danish musicians
1987 births
Living people
21st-century Danish musicians
People from Slagelse Municipality